Suriname competed at the 1996 Summer Olympics in Atlanta, United States.

Athletics

Men

Women

Badminton

Swimming

Men

Women

References
 Official Olympic Reports
 sports-reference

Nations at the 1996 Summer Olympics
1996
Oly